Song Jong-ho (born October 5, 1976) is a South Korean actor. Song debuted as a runway model in Park Byung-chul's fashion show in 1995. His print and runway modeling career lasted until 1999, when he turned to acting. He is best known for his roles in Will It Snow for Christmas? (2009), The Princess' Man (2011), and Reply 1997 (2012).

Career
Song Jong-ho majored in Computer Statistics at Pyeongtaek University, but he soon realized that his true passion lay in entertainment. In 1995, he made his debut as a model in a fashion show of designer Park Byung-chul. Song's print and runway modeling career lasted until 1999, when he turned to acting. Song first appeared in sitcoms and television dramas in minor and supporting roles.

In 2007, he drew notice as a surgical intern in the medical drama Surgeon Bong Dal-hee, for which he received a New Star Award at the SBS Drama Awards. Another notable role followed in the 2009 melodrama Will It Snow for Christmas?, as a penniless man whose family went bankrupt during the IMF crisis, and thus feels conflicted about falling for an heiress. Song said he cried when he first read Lee Kyung-hee's script, describing it as "so entertaining and sad and it had a lot of great lines," that he begged his manager to get him cast in the drama.

In 2011, Song's profile rose further when he starred in The Princess' Man, a period drama set in the Joseon Dynasty which drew both high ratings and critical acclaim. In it, he played a nobleman fallen on hard times who betrays his best friend in order to possess the woman he loves and achieve his ambition. This was followed by the popular Reply 1997, a nostalgic cable drama in which Song played a warm-hearted computer genius-turned-politician loosely based on Ahn Cheol-soo, and was part of the show's central love triangle.

Song returned to the Joseon era in his next two projects. He made his big screen debut in The Grand Heist (2012), an ensemble heist comedy about a group of quirky professionals who attempt to steal ice (a valuable commodity at the time) from the royal storage. Then in The Fugitive of Joseon (2013), Song portrayed an uigeumbu, an intelligent and tenacious investigator hunting down the protagonist until he becomes convinced of the latter's innocence and they join forces.

He then made guest appearances on The Suspicious Housekeeper (as a stalker) and Beyond the Clouds (as the heroine's fiancé whose death early in the drama serves as a catalyst). Not long after, Song headlined The Reason I'm Getting Married, which was featured on the single-episode anthology, KBS Drama Special.

Filmography

Television series

Film

Variety show

Music video

Musical theatre

Awards and nominations

References

External links
 Song Jong-ho at Blossom Entertainment 
  
 
 

1976 births
Living people
20th-century South Korean male actors
21st-century South Korean male actors
South Korean male television actors
South Korean male film actors
South Korean male musical theatre actors
South Korean male models
Male actors from Seoul
Models from Seoul